The R284 road is a regional road in Ireland linking Sligo to Leitrim village in County Leitrim. En route it passes through Ballygawley, Ballyfarnan, Geevagh and Keadue.

Official description

The official description of the R284 from the Roads Act 1993 (Classification of Regional Roads) Order 2006  reads:

Carrowroe, County Sligo - Leitrim, County Leitrim

Between its junction with N4 at Tonaforte and its junction with R287 at Carraroe all in the county of Sligo 
- and -
between its junction with R287 at Carrowroe in the county of Sligo and its junction with R280 at Leitrim in the county of Leitrim via Drumaskibbole, Ballygawley, Sooey, Conway's Cross and Geevagh in the county of Sligo: Ballyfarnan, Keadew West Keadew and Drumboylan in the county of Roscommon: and Drumhierny in the county of Leitrim.

See also
Roads in Ireland
National primary road
National secondary road

References

Regional roads in the Republic of Ireland
Roads in County Leitrim
Roads in County Sligo